Badmingtons (in Macedonian: Бадмингтонс) were a prominent Macedonian punk rock band.

Biography
Badmingtons were formed in 1983 in Skopje, then SR Macedonia (now the Republic of Macedonia) by Vladimir Petrovski - Karter (guitar and vocals), Dean Škartov - Deko (keyboards) and Boris Georgiev - But (drums).

Previously, Karter had played in one of the line-ups of Fol Jazik (the first punk band in Skopje, formed 1978) and later in Saraceni, another legendary punk group, which also featured the now-internationally acclaimed musician Goran Trajkoski. Boris Georgiev was a former drummer in Jadro, which included members from several countries, as well as in the bands Pop and Dizajn. He visited London in the 1970s where he acquainted himself with the punk movement. Since purchasing his Yamaha CS-15 electronic keyboard in the late 1970s, Deko initially played in the group Kocka led, but later, in 1983 he joined Karter and But to form Badmingtons.

In 1984 Badmingtons recorded their first demo tape, and got the first prize at the Macedonian demo bands competition Rokfest, which gave them an opportunity to record in the acclaimed M-2 studio of the music production branch of the national Macedonian Radio-Television. They recorded several songs, one of which was their trademark track "Site obični luđe" ("All the common people"). The new recordings were joined together with the previous material and released as the demo album titled "Posle mene što ti e gajle" in 1985. "Site obični luđe" became a Macedonian punk anthem and later was covered by several other artists including the notable alternative rock group SunS in the 1990s. Badmingtons were also included with this song in the Makedonski dokument (Macedonian Document) compilation album along with other notable underground music acts. The style of Badmingtons is a straightforward punk rock, however occasionally they would go beyond the style into a sort of experimental rock. As well as Posle mene shto ti e gajle, the group also issued an EP called Intimno tetoviranje, featuring "Site obichni lugje" and four Serbian-language songs.

Badmingtons ceased to exist in 1986 and transformed themselves into a new band called Aleksandar Makedonski (Alexander The Great). The new band were initially a more pop-rock oriented act and also included some new additional members. Their debut album "Za heroje i princeze" was released for Jugodisk record label in 1988 in Serbo-Croat, because it was the most widespread language in the multilingual former Yugoslav federal market. In the same year, Boris Georgiev left them and joined the gothic rock cult band Mizar and played drums on their first self-titled album in 1988. Deko remained in Aleksandar Makedonski until 1988. Later he was member of the psychedelic rock group Kleržo until 1991, when he left the country for Italy, where he spent several years before returning. On the other hand, Karter lived in Germany for a while and continued to work with Aleksandar Makedonski after coming back to Skopje. In the early 1990s they recorded several songs in the studio of Kokan Dimuševski (of Leb i sol), one of them being a duet with Goran Tanevski of Mizar. Karter performed at the Strip & Sound festival in Skopje in 1995. One year later Aleksandar Makedonski released the album Moeto carstvo. The lineup on Moeto carstvo can be seen as a Badmingtons reunion of sorts, due to all three original Badmingtons members playing on the album. In 1997 Karter formed a new band called Opstrukcija, which released the album Sistem.

In 2002 Badmingtons briefly reunited for the summer open-air festival Alarm held in Ljubaništa on the Ohrid Lake, Ohrid Municipality, where they shared the main stage with the famous British punk band UK Subs and other prominent acts on 13 July.

Badmingtons gathered for a one-off reunion after their music was used for the soundtrack of the feature film Prevrteno (Upside Down) directed by Igor Ivanov - Izi in 2007. The reunion concert took place in the Youth Cultural Centre (MKC) in Skopje on 3 December 2007 as a part of the Taksirat festival annually organized by Lithium Records.

Discography 
 Posle mene što ti e gajle (1985 cassette, compilation of three songs from a session at Studio M2 of RTS and earlier demos)
 Intimno tetoviranje (1985 cassette EP)
 "Ako mi dadesh" (2007 CD single)

See also
Music of the Republic of Macedonia
Punk rock in Yugoslavia
Popular music in the Socialist Federal Republic of Yugoslavia

References
Dragan Pavlov and Dejan Šunjka: Punk u Jugoslaviji (Punk in Yugoslavia), publisher: IGP Dedalus, 1990. 
Forum Plus Magazine interview 
Macedonian Music Network 
Alarm Festival 2002 
Janjatović, Petar: Ilustrovana Enciklopedija YU Rocka 1960-1997, article: Aleksandar Makedonski, page: 13, publisher: Geopoetika, 1997

External links
Badmingtons on Myspace

 

Macedonian rock music groups
Yugoslav punk rock groups
Yugoslav rock music groups
Macedonian post-punk music groups